Monopterus is a genus of swamp eels native to Asia. They live in various freshwater habitats and some have a fossorial lifestyle.

Species
Four recognized species are placed in this genus:
 M. albus (Zuiew, 1793) (Asian swamp eel)
 M. bicolor H. D. Nguyễn & V. H. Nguyễn, 2005
 M. dienbienensis V. H. Nguyễn & H. D. Nguyễn, 2005
 M. javanensis Lacépède, 1800

Six species from South Asia (M. cuchia, M. desilvai, M. hodgarti, M. fossorius, M. ichthyophoides, and M. indicus) have been reclassified to the genus Ophichthys. Four fossorial or subterranean species (M. digressus, M. eapeni, M. rongsaw, and M. roseni) from India have been reclassified to the genus Rakthamichthys. Two species from Africa (M. boueti and M. luticolus) have been reclassified to the genus Typhlosynbranchus.

References

 
Freshwater fish genera
Synbranchidae
Taxa named by Bernard Germain de Lacépède
Taxonomy articles created by Polbot